The UNESCO/Institut Pasteur Medal is a biennial international science prize created jointly by UNESCO and the Pasteur Institute in 1995 "to be awarded in recognition of outstanding research contributing to a beneficial impact on human health and to the advancement of scientific knowledge in related fields such as medicine, fermentations, agriculture and food." Its creation marked the centenary of the death of Louis Pasteur. The future of the prize is under review.

Laureates

See also

 List of biomedical science awards

References

Awards established in 1995
Biomedical awards
French science and technology awards
Pasteur Institute
Institut